Martha Elba Guadalupe Higareda Cervantes (born August 24, 1983) is a Mexican actress, producer and screenwriter.

Life and career
Higareda was born in Villahermosa, Tabasco, Mexico, the daughter of actress Martha Cervantes and artist and therapist Jose Luis Higareda,  and sister of actress Miriam Higareda. She began acting on the stage at a very early age, along with dancing jazz, flamenco, tap and folklore. At 14, she moved to Mexico City from her native Tabasco to pursue an acting career. Her debut was in theater participating in various plays, including "Little Women" and "Don Juan."

Being an advanced student, she entered College several years early at the age of 15; studying Communications at El Tecnologico de Monterrey. She would attend college in the mornings while going to acting school in the evenings and performing in theater on the weekends. A year later her mother and sister moved to Mexico City and attended acting school with her. She had her first TV debut as an anchor hostess in  Disney Channel’s Zapping Zone.

Alfonso Cuaron came to Mexico City auditioning for Y Tu Mamá También, Martha got the part of Cecilia Huerta, Gael Garcia's girlfriend in the film, but being underage and due to the full on nudity in the movie she was not able to do the role. Cuaron encouraged her to keep pursuing her acting career. Soon after, she changed her major from Communications to the Performing Arts. In 2002, Higareda had her first leading role in the movie Amarte Duele, directed by Fernando Sariñana, in which she shares credits with Luis Fernando Peña and Alfonso Herrera.

The movie quickly became a box office hit and launched Martha's career giving her the nickname "The Mexican Sweetheart". She received The Silver Goddess award for her performance as female lead and the MTV movies favorite actress award.

In 2003, she was offered the lead in a Mexican TV show Enamórate on TV Azteca, next to Yahir, where she also shared credits with María Inés Guerra, Martha Cristiana, Fernando Sarfati, and Amara Villafuerte.  But Higareda's passion was in making movies. Higareda returned with the movie Siete Días next to Jaime Camil, in which she played a girl whose dream is to make U2 come to the city of Monterrey in less than a week.

She worked with Carlos Carrera (El crimen del Padre Amaro) in Sexo, amor y otras perversiones winning another Silver Goddess Award. And that same year she was nominated as best supporting actress for the Mexican Academy Awards for her role in Fuera del Cielo, In 2007, she came with her latest production Niñas Mal, directed by Fernando Sariñana where she shared credits with Camila Sodi and Ximena Sariñana.  The movie produced by Columbia Pictures was a huge success in which Higareda portrayed punk stubborn yet sweet Adela, her unusual haircut and fashion statement quickly became a trend in Mexican teenagers.

She booked her first American movie in 2007 Borderland where she shared credits with Brian Presley and Beto Cuevas produced by Lionsgate. The movie was screening in the American Film Market when an Agent approached her, he introduced Martha to Craig Shapiro, whom to this day represents Higareda at ICM Partners. Shapiro convinced Martha to move to LA. In 2008, she moved to Hollywood to audition and study script writing and that same year, she worked in David Ayer's film Street Kings, sharing credits with Keanu Reeves, Hugh Laurie, and Forest Whitaker.

She went back to her country with three finished scripts and at the age of 25 she wrote and produced her first independent film, Te presento a Laura. The movie was in the top ten films in box-office for 10 consecutive weeks. She shot the prequel to the crime/action film Smokin' Aces, Smokin' Aces 2: Assassins' Ball, as a deadly female assassin with poisonous lips. In 2012, she appeared in Hello Herman with Norman Reedus as an American reporter.

In Lies in Plain Sight she played the lead role, as a visually impaired woman trying to solve the murder of her sister. For this performance she won an Imagen Awards.

In 2014, she also wrote, produced and starred in "Casese Quien Pueda" (Marry me if you can) directed by Marco Polo Constandse and produced by Martha and Miri Higareda and Alejandra Cardenas. The movie quickly became the second biggest box office record of its time. This caught the attention of the American Studios. "I wanted not only to be in movies, but to know the guts of the industry. Making movies it's all a team effort, so if you surround yourself with the best people you learn from them and then if you can also give an opportunity to those whom you believe in their talent, magical things happen"

She won the Mayahuel Award at the Guadalajara International Film Festival for the movie Mariachi Gringo, and that same year she played Amparo in the miniseries Carlos. She worked in the Disney movie McFarland, USA with director Nikki Caro.

In 2016, she produced and starred in No manches Frida, with Edward Allen and Mauricio Arguelles. From Pantelion, Lionsgate, Videocine and Constantin Film, No Manches Frida was another box office hit, where Higareda plays shy yet passionate Miss Lucy who falls in love with a criminal (Omar Chaparro). Martha pitched Chaparro for the role. Made for $2.5 million, the film made 23 million dollars in the box office.

Higareda produced with Miguel Mier, Jimena Rodriguez, Bernardo Rugama the box office success and Mexican adaptation of 3 idiots, a story about following your true passion. This subject has always interested Higareda as she has toured around her country giving inspirational yet grounding talks to teenagers.

In 2018, Higareda starred in Netflix's Altered Carbon, a hard-boiled tech noir television series based on the book by Richard K. Morgan, as detective Kristin Ortega.
She also stars in Queen of The South as Castel, niece to a Colombian cartel leader Reynaldo Fieto.

In 2019, she played the lead role of Marisol in Hulu's American horror anthology television series, Into the Dark, episode "Culture Shock".

Filmography

Film roles

Television roles

References

External links

1983 births
Living people
Mexican telenovela actresses
Mexican film actresses
Mexican stage actresses
Actresses from Tabasco
Mexican women film producers
Mexican women writers
Mexican women screenwriters
21st-century Mexican actresses
People from Villahermosa
Naturalized citizens of the United States